Whorl Inside a Loop is a play written by Dick Scanlan and Sherie Rene Scott. The playwrights spent several weeks working with inmates at a medium-security prison on a theater project, and then subsequently wrote a play depicting similar events.

The play premiered Off-Broadway on August 27, 2015 at the Second Stage Theatre, directed by Scalan and Michael Mayer. (Scott, Scalan and Mayer previously collaborated on Everyday Rapture.)

References

2015 plays
American plays
Off-Broadway plays